Cervoni can refer to:

 Jean-Baptiste Cervoni (1765 – 1809) a general officer in the French army during the French Revolutionary Wars
 Isabella Cervoni 1575–1600) was an Italian poet of the Counter-Reformation period
 Vincent Cervoni Schopenhauer (1991-) better known by the in-game name Happy, French Counter-Strike: Global Offensive (CS:GO) player
 Francesco Cervoni (1938-)Lt General, Chief of Staff of the Italian Army, 1997-2001